The Paramount Theatre, also known as The Playhouse, is a historic performance theatre located in Rutland, Vermont. The theatre hosts many events and performances and is a contributing property to the Rutland Downtown Historic District, which is listed on the National Register of Historic Places.

History
In 1913, George Chaffee built a theatre called the Playhouse.  The exterior of the Playhouse had a classical style reflecting the City Beautiful movement of the time, while the interior resembled a Victorian era opera house with lavish decoration.  The theatre was renamed The Paramount in 1931, and its entertainment shifted from live performance to movies.  The movie theater closed in 1977.  In 1999, a local group began restoring the theatre to its historic appearance.  The theatre reopened in March 2000 and serves again as a center for artistic, cultural, and educational events.

References

External links
Paramount Theater

Theatres completed in 1913
Theatres on the National Register of Historic Places in Vermont
Theatres in Vermont
Buildings and structures in Rutland, Vermont
Tourist attractions in Rutland County, Vermont
Historic district contributing properties in Vermont
1913 establishments in Vermont
National Register of Historic Places in Rutland County, Vermont